Gerhard Loos (21 August 1916 – 6 March 1944) was a Luftwaffe fighter ace and recipient of the Knight's Cross of the Iron Cross during World War II. Loos is credited with 92 aerial victories, 14 of which claimed in Defense of the Reich.

On 6 March 1944 Loos flying a Messerschmitt Bf 109 and was shot down in aerial combat near Rheinsehlen by Lieutenant John Howell of the 357th Fighter Group. Hanging on his parachute he was drifting into a high voltage power line. Releasing the parachute at  he fell to his death.

Summary of career

Aerial victory claims
According to US historian David T. Zabecki, Loos was credited with 92 aerial victories.

Awards
 Iron Cross (1939) 2nd and 1st class
 Ehrenpokal der Luftwaffe (20 September 1943)
 German Cross in Gold on 17 October 1943 as Leutnant in the 1./Jagdgeschwader 54
 Knight's Cross of the Iron Cross on 5 February 1944 as Leutnant and Staffelführer of the 8./Jagdgeschwader 54

Notes

References

Citations

Bibliography

 
 
 
 
 

 

1916 births
1944 deaths
Aviators killed by being shot down
Luftwaffe personnel killed in World War II
German World War II flying aces
Luftwaffe pilots
People from the Kingdom of Bohemia
People from Most (city)
Recipients of the Gold German Cross
Recipients of the Knight's Cross of the Iron Cross
Sudeten German people
Accidental deaths from falls